Arab Belgians, also referred to as Belgian Arabs (Belgische Arabieren), are Belgians whose ancestry traces back to the Arab World.

Overview
Most Arabs (and Muslims) living in Belgium are of Moroccan descent. Today, about 500,000 Moroccans live in Belgium. The influx of Moroccans in Belgium was favored by the signing of a treaty of employment of Moroccan workers in Belgium between the two countries on 17 February 1964. Among notable Belgians of Moroccan descent are footballer Marouane Fellaini, choreographer Sidi Larbi Cherkaoui, actress Lubna Azabal and model Halima Chehaima.

The Arab European League was founded in 2000 in Antwerp, Belgium by Dyab Abou Jahjah. He was criticized for proposing that Arabic be recognized as Belgium's fourth language, being accused of inciting hatred and "playing into the hands of the country's far-right anti-immigrant Vlaams Blok".

There are many mosques in the country (an estimated 328–380). The Great Mosque of Brussels, built in 1879 in Arabic style by Belgian architect Ernest Van Humbeeck, is the oldest mosque in Brussels. It was originally built as the Eastern Pavillon for the 1880 Brussels National Exhibition, then abandoned, restored and turned into mosque in 1978.

Notable people

Lubna Azabal (1973), actress
Anissa Blondin (1992), model
Athene (1980), gamer
Nacer Chadli (1989), footballer
Halima Chehaima (1988), beauty pageant 
Chérine (1995), singer and songwriter
Sidi Larbi Cherkaoui (1976), dancer and choreographer
Laetitia Darche (1991), model
Mehdi Dehbi (1985), actor
Saïd El Khadraoui (1975), politician
Zakia Khattabi (1976), politician
Marouane Fellaini (1987), footballer
David Guetta (1967), DJ and music producer
Faris Haroun (1985), footballer
Nadjim Haroun (1988), footballer
Hande Kodja (1984), actress
Hadja Lahbib (1970), politician
Sammy Mahdi (1988), politician
Naziha Mestaoui (1975–2020), architect
Tarec Saffiedine (1986), mixed martial artist
Nadia Sminate (1981), politician
Stromae (1985), singer
Tamino (1996), musician
Nabil Ben Yadir (1979), film director
DJ Yung Vamp (1995), DJ and record producer
Sandra Zidani (1968), comedian, actress and humorist

See also
Arab European League
Arab diaspora
Arabs in Europe
Moroccans in Belgium
Lebanese Belgians
Tunisian diaspora
Lebanese diaspora
Syrian diaspora
Palestinian diaspora
Moroccan diaspora
Iraqi diaspora
Egyptian diaspora

References

External links

Arab diaspora in Europe
 
Middle Eastern diaspora in Belgium
Ethnic groups in Belgium
Muslim communities in Europe